Şixandağ (also, Shakhan-Dag and Shakhan-Dag, Kishlak) is a village in the Gobustan Rayon of Azerbaijan.

References 

Populated places in Gobustan District